STN MTN / Kauai is the combined release of the seventh mixtape and second extended play (EP) by American recording artist Childish Gambino. The STN MTN mixtape was released on October 2, 2014 as a free download from DatPiff, while the Kauai EP was made available the following day through online music stores by Glassnote Records. They are each considered dual sides of a concept album that are unified by a cohesive story line, and come ten months after Glover's second studio album, Because the Internet.

Background
Producers who contributed to the mixtape include Donald Glover himself, as well as Nick Banga, Big Soj, Ludwig Göransson, Chris Hartz, Tim Suby, and Zaytoven.

On October 5, 2014, fans on Reddit discovered a hidden a cappella verse on one of Donald Glover's websites. It was confirmed by Gambino that the verse syncs up with the instrumental portion of "V. 3005 (Beach Picnic Version)".

While STN MTN is free, the proceeds from the sales of Kauai are dedicated to maintaining and preserving Kauai island, which the second half of the EP is named after. The letters STN MTN are a disemvowelment of Glover's hometown, Stone Mountain, Georgia.

Composition
STN MTN is a concept mixtape where Glover is asleep dreaming he "ran Atlanta", with songs based on modern day southern hip hop. The mixtape ends with Glover awaking from this dream on the Hawaiian island, Kauai. Kauai is a concept EP. Unlike STN MTN, Kauai focuses on themes such as love, nostalgia and passion, using alternative R&B. A song from the EP Kauai, "Retro [Rough]", is based on Gambino's earlier song, "Love Is Crazy" featuring Eugene Cordero, from his mixtape Sick Boi.

Critical reception

STN MTN / Kauai has received generally positive reviews. DJ Booth gave the project a 4.7/5 stars, calling it "a cohesive project... it's Gambino so there will be at least some depth to make a follow up review worth while." Zach Dionne of Complex gave a positive review saying that "In a couple songs, he flies us there, thousands of miles away from Atlanta, to see for ourselves."

Commercial performance
Kauai debuted at number 18 on the Billboard 200, selling 16,000 copies in its first week. In its second week, the EP rose to number 16 on the chart, selling 19,000 copies, bringing its two-week total to 35,000 copies. In its third week, the EP dropped down to number 46 on the chart, selling 7,000 copies, bringing the total album sales to 42,000 copies in the United States.

Track listing

Charts

Release history

References

2014 EPs
2014 mixtape albums
Concept albums
Donald Glover albums
Glassnote Records EPs
Albums produced by Zaytoven
Alternative R&B albums